, also known as The Assassin, is a 1964 film directed by Masahiro Shinoda.

Release
Assassination was released in Japan in 1964. The film was released in the United States on October 30, 1964 by Shochiku Films of America.

Cast 
 Tetsurō Tamba – Hachirô Kiyokawa
 Shima Iwashita – Oren
 Isao Kimura – Tadasaburô Sasaki
 Eiji Okada – Lord Matsudaira
 Eitaro Ozawa – Premier Itakura
 Takanobu Hozumi – Tetsutaro Yamaoka
 Junkichi Orimoto – Kamo Serizawa
 Yukio Ninagawa – Shôhei Imuta
 Muga Takewaki - Miyagawa
 Keiji Sada – Sakamoto Ryōma

References

Footnotes

Sources

External links
 Assassination essay by Joan Mellen at the Masters of Cinema website
 Assassination trailer at the Masters of Cinema website
 
 
  

1964 films
1960s historical drama films
Japanese black-and-white films
Films directed by Masahiro Shinoda
1960s Japanese-language films
Jidaigeki films
Samurai films
Shochiku films
Japanese historical drama films
Films scored by Toru Takemitsu
1964 drama films
Films set in Bakumatsu
1960s Japanese films